Qeshlaq-e Ganjeh (also Romanized as Qeshlāq-e Ganjeh; also known simply as Qeshlaq (Persian: قشلاق), also Romanized as Qeshlāq and Qishlāq) is a village in Japelaq-e Sharqi Rural District, Japelaq District, Azna County, Lorestan Province, Iran. At the 2006 census, its population was 102, in 25 families.

References 

Towns and villages in Azna County